Tumor protein p63, typically referred to as p63, also known as transformation-related protein 63 is a protein that in humans is encoded by the TP63 (also known as the  p63) gene.

The TP63 gene was discovered 20 years after the discovery of the p53 tumor suppressor gene and along with p73 constitutes the p53 gene family based on their structural similarity.  Despite being discovered significantly later than p53, phylogenetic analysis of p53, p63 and p73, suggest that p63 was the original member of the family from which p53 and p73 evolved.

Function 
Tumor protein p63 is a member of the p53 family of transcription factors. p63 -/- mice have several developmental defects which include the lack of limbs and other tissues, such as teeth and mammary glands, which develop as a result of interactions between mesenchyme and epithelium. TP63 encodes for two main isoforms by alternative promoters (TAp63 and ΔNp63). ΔNp63 is involved in multiple functions during skin development and in adult stem/progenitor cell regulation. In contrast, TAp63 has been mostly restricted to its apoptotic function and more recently as the guardian of oocyte integrity. Recently, two new functions have been attributed to TAp63 in heart development and premature aging.

In mice, p63 is required for normal skin development via direct transcription of the membrane protein PERP.  TP63 can also regulate PERP expression with TP53 in human cancer.

Clinical significance 

At least 42 disease-causing mutations in this gene have been discovered. TP63 mutations underlie several malformation syndromes that include cleft lip and/or palate as a hallmark feature. Mutations in the TP63 gene are associated with ectrodactyly-ectodermal dysplasia-cleft syndrome in which a midline cleft lip is a common feature, cleft lip/palate syndrome 3 (EEC3); ectrodactyly (also known as split-hand/foot malformation 4 (SHFM4)); ankyloblepharon-ectodermal dysplasia-cleft lip/palate (AEC) or Hay–Wells syndrome in which a midline cleft lip is also a common feature, Acro–dermato–ungual–lacrimal–tooth syndrome (ADULT); limb-mammary syndrome; Rap-Hodgkin syndrome (RHS); and orofacial cleft 8. 

Both cleft lip with or without a cleft palate and cleft palate only features have been seen to segregate within the same family with a TP63 mutation. Recently, induced pluripotent stem cells have been produced from patients affected by EEC syndromes by cell reprogramming. The defective epithelial commitment could be partially rescued by a small therapeutic compound.

Molecular mechanism 
Transcription factor p63 is a key regulator of epidermal keratinocyte proliferation and differentiation. In a recent study, researchers used EEC-patient-derived skin keratinocytes carrying heterozygous p63 DNA-binding domain mutations as the cellular model to characterize the global gene regulatory alteration. The epidermal cell identity was compromised in p63 mutant keratinocytes. Besides, p63-binding loss and loss of active enhancers occurs at a genome-wide scale in patient keratinocytes carrying heterozygous EEC mutations.  Besides, using a multi-omics approach, the deregulated function of DNA loops mediated by p63 and CTCF represents an additional layer to the disease mechanism. It seems that a number of loci nearby epidermal genes were organized into a ‘regulatory chromatin hub’ within the chromatin interactions, mediated by CTCF in epidermal keratinocytes. Such hubs contain multiple connecting DNA loops that require not only CTCF binding that is rather static but also binding of cell type-specific TFs, like p63, for the transcriptional activity. In this model, p63 may be essential to make the DNA loops active in transcription.

Vulvar cancer 
TP63 has been observed overexpressed in Vulvar Squamous Cell Carcinoma samples, in association with hypermethylation-Induced inactivation of the IRF6 tumor suppressor gene.  Indeed, mRNA levels of TP63 tested higher in Vulvar cancer samples when compared with those of normal skin and preneoplastic vulvar lesions, thus underscoring an epigenetic cross-link between IRF6 gene and the oncogene TP63.

Diagnostic utility 
p63 immunostaining has utility for head and neck squamous cell carcinomas, differentiating prostatic adenocarcinoma (the most common type of prostate cancer) and benign prostatic tissue; normal prostatic glands stain with p63 (as they have basal cells), while the malignant glands in prostatic adenocarcinoma (which lacks these cells) do not.
P63 is also helpful in distinguishing poorly differentiated squamous cell carcinoma from small cell carcinoma or adenocarcinoma. P63 should be strongly stained in poorly differentiated squamous cell, but negative in small cell or adenocarcinoma.

Interactions 
TP63 has been shown to interact with HNRPAB.
It also activates IRF6 transcription through the IRF6 enhancer element.

Regulation

There is some evidence that the expression of p63 is regulated by the microRNA miR-203 and USP28 at protein level

See also 
AMACR - another marker for prostate adenocarcinoma

References

Further reading

External links 
 
  GeneReviews/NCBI/NIH/UW entry on Ankyloblepharon-Ectodermal Defects-Cleft Lip/Palate Syndrome or AEC Syndrome, Hay-Wells Syndrome. Includes: Rapp–Hodgkin Syndrome
 OMIM entries on AEC